Yesterdays Universe is an album released on Stones Throw Records. The album, produced entirely by Madlib, marks the end of the group Yesterdays New Quintet as Madlib's jazz project and the beginning of Yesterdays Universe.

Background
Most of these names and groups are, in fact, Madlib aliases, Madlib solo projects, or groups Madlib has with other artists such as Karriem Riggins and Ivan "Mamao" Conti of Azymuth.

The universe refers to Madlib's virtual band of animated jazz musicians, all of whom were created by Madlib.  The groups include The Last Electro-Acoustic Space Jazz Ensemble, Kamala Walker and The Soul Tribe, Monk Hughes & The Outer Realm, The Eddie Prince Fusion Band, Joe McDuphrey Experience, The Jahari Massamba Unit, Yesterdays New Quintet, Young Jazz Rebels, Sound Directions, Jackson Conti, The Jazzistics, Malik Flavors, Ahmad Miller and Suntouch. Many of the tracks on the album are taken from previous Yesterdays Universe releases, most of which were released by Stones Throw exclusively on vinyl.

The song "Two for Strata-East" is a tribute to the jazz label Strata-East Records, founded in 1971 by Stanley Cowell and Charles Tolliver.

Track listing

External links
Yesterdays Universe on Stones Throw
Yesterdays New Quintet on Stones Throw

2007 albums
Madlib albums
Stones Throw Records albums
Albums produced by Madlib